The Roskilde Festival is a Danish music festival held annually south of Roskilde. It is one of the largest music festivals in Europe and the largest in the Nordic countries. It was created in 1971 by two high school students and a promoter. In 1972, the festival was taken over by the Roskilde Foundation, which has since run the festival as a non-profit organization for development and support of music, culture and humanism. In 2014, the Roskilde Foundation provided festival participants with the opportunity to nominate and vote upon which organizations should receive funds raised by the festival.

The Roskilde Festival was Denmark's first music-oriented festival created for hippies, and today covers more of the mainstream youth from Scandinavia and the rest of Europe. Most festival visitors are Danes, but there are also many visitors from elsewhere, especially the other Scandinavian countries and Germany.

History

The beginning

The first Roskilde Festival was held on 28 and 29 August 1971, originally named the Sound Festival. It was created by the two high schoolers Mogens Sandfær, Jesper Switzer Møller and promoter Carl Fischer. It was inspired by festivals and youth gatherings like Newport, Isle of Wight and Woodstock. It was characterized mainly by poor management but also great enthusiasm. The festival's inaugural year saw roughly 20 bands ranging from folk, jazz, rock and pop genres all playing on a single stage, which lasted for two days with some 10,000–13,000 visitors. Because of a lack of time and funds, the two high schoolers withdrew and the next year's festival, under the name Fantasy Festival, was arranged by the non-profit Roskilde Foundation and the American folk singer Tony Busch. The foundation had been involved in Roskilde's city festival since 1932 and had the necessary contacts. Unlike the first year, the 1972 festival produced a surplus and the foundation was able to donate 50,000 dkk (equalling  330,000 dkk in 2020) to local projects for children and youths. Many volunteers had been involved in the 1972 festival and this, along with being non-profit, would become a hallmark of the future festivals. Since 1973, the Roskilde Foundation (today known as the Roskilde Festival Group) alone has been responsible for arranging the festival.

In 1978, festival organizers acquired the Canopy Scene, an orange musical stage previously used by The Rolling Stones on a European tour. Since its beginning, the Canopy Scene and its characteristic arches have become a well-known symbol and logo representing the festival.

Expansion and professionalization

By the early 1980s, the festival was large and well-established, but the workload had become unmanageable for an organization of all-volunteers. It was decided that a professional board of directors and people in several other fields were necessary. Nevertheless, the festival remains non-profit and still relies heavily on thousands of volunteers.

From the 1980s, there has been an expansion in the music genres represented at the festival and more stages have been added. They have continued their history of hiring a combination of large international bands, local bands, and up-and-coming bands, like U2 in 1981. In the 1990s, electronic music was introduced to the festival. In 1991, Club Roskilde was held, which was an electronic music dance club held in the evenings. In 1995, electronic music artists received their own stage. In the following years, even more room for electronic music was created by the establishment of the chill-out zone and the Roskilde Lounge. Since then, artists like Fatboy Slim, The Prodigy, Basement Jaxx and Chemical Brothers appeared on the main stage.

By the 1990s, the number of tickets offered for sale was restricted and later even reduced. Due to steadily increasing popularity of the festival, the number of visitors had increased to up to 125,000. In addition, 90,000 tickets for about 25,000 volunteers, 5,000 media people and 3,000 artists were added. In order to preserve the quality of the festival, the festival organizers decided to limit the number of participants. The distance from the rearmost part of the camping area to the stages of the festival management seemed to have become unreasonable. The festival had become so popular that the festival management decided in 1994 to expand the festival area to the west, providing more space without increasing distances between the campgrounds and the concert venues. The festival site was now divided by the small railway line into two parts. In 1995 the festival inaugurated its own train station, which facilitates the arrival of visitors. In 1997, another tent called Roskilde Ballroom was built. If Roskilde Festival visitors are included in the population of Roskilde, it is the fourth-largest city in Denmark. 

In the 2000s, there has been an increasing focus on the footprint of the festival. In 2017, 90 percent of the food sold in food stalls at the festival was organic and a container-deposit system (expanded compared to the one that already exists in Denmark) has been introduced, which resulted in more than eight million items being returned in that year's festival alone. There are programs for efficient waste sorting, increase of recycling levels, and a reduction of the amount of garbage produced. A partnership with DSB has resulted in more direct train links between the Copenhagen Central Station and the Roskilde Festival station, making it easier to reach by public transport.

Stages

The bands presented at Roskilde Festival are traditionally a balanced mix of large, well-known artists, cutting-edge artists from all contemporary genres, popular crowd-pleasing acts plus local Scandinavian headliners and up-and-coming names.

The stages were until 2003 named after their colour, but as the names had not matched the actual color of the tents for a period, it was decided to rename all stages except the Orange Stage, the central and main stage. The Orange Stage is open in front of a huge field, whereas the other tents cover the whole audience, the largest of which is the Arena stage (formerly known as Green Stage), the largest tent in Europe with an official capacity of 17,000 people. The 2007 edition saw two new tents, replacing Ballroom (1997–2006) which presented mainly World music, and Metropol (2003–2006) which presented mainly Electronica. In 2010 two stages, Astoria (from 2007) and Lounge, did not return, due to a slight shift in focus towards fewer, but bigger bands. In 2014 the Odeon stage was cancelled along with the surrounding sustainable-style food outlets, and the area was replaced with pre-booked tents for festival guests that prefer not to bring their own.

The music covers such styles as rock, Hip Hop, Metal, urban, electronica and 3rd world contemporary music. It has become a tradition to let a Danish act open the Orange Stage on the first day of the festival. There are often surprising performances by classical acts, film-music, opera etc.

Apart from music there is always some theatre and 'lone acts' wandering around the festival site. Terrain and tents are always decorated in various ways. The current tents are:

Campsite

It usually opens on Saturday afternoon prior to the festival itself. Apart from the small and separate Camping South it is divided into two areas, East and West, each comprising a service center with establishments ranging from food stalls to a cinema. The campsite is further divided into 'agoras' that provide toilets, cell phone charging and luggage storage. They also host events according to each agora's theme.

As of 2018, a new gate system has been installed. This means that all guests arriving first fill 7 rows of the gate system (1000 people in each). Behind this, a large field holding all remaining guests. At 16:00 on the opening Saturday, the gates open, one row at a time at approx 90sec intervals. Once this is complete, the remaining guest in the back area are free to enter the camping area. The concert sites only open the following day.

Every year since 1999, on the Saturday of the festival (held on a Thursday in 2015, 2016 and 2017), Roskilde Festival Radio organizes a naked run in a fenced-in track around the camp site. One male and one female winner receive a ticket for the next year's festival. The run has subsequently become a very popular and "legendary" part of the festival.

Newspaper

The Orange Press (named after the main stage) is a newspaper that specifically deals with events relevant to the festival. First published in 1995, it is made by more than 70 journalists, photographers and music reviewer. It is published daily during the festival and available online and on-site for free.

Specific years

Overview 1971–present

2000 crush 

During Pearl Jam's concert at the Orange Stage on 30 June 2000, a crush occurred. Nine people died, and twenty-six people were injured, three of them seriously. The dead, all male, were a 26-year-old German, a 23-year-old Dutchman, a 24-year-old Australian (who died a few days later in a hospital), three Swedes, two aged 22 and one 20, and three Danes, one aged 22 and two aged 17.

The concert began late in the evening around 22:30 CET and had an audience of about 50,000, a fairly typical size for large concerts at this stage. About half an hour after the concert began, many people fell down at one place, primarily due to a series of wave-like motions in the audience, which were the result of some trying to get closer to the stage. When they did not immediately get up, others were pushed over them and crowd surfers fell into this "hole" that was a few metres in size. The people at the bottom died of asphyxiation, likely within less than five minutes. On the day of the incident, there was also heavy rainfall, which could have contributed to the ground being slippery. Most people who fell were at a location not far from the stage, but initially not easily seen and out of easy reach for the security guards because of the dense crowd. Some of the concertgoers who were lifted over the barrier at the stage told the security about the seriousness of the situation further back. The band was informed and stopped the music, and told the crowd to step back. This had an effect, but it still took several more minutes before it was possible to get all the victims. The victims were taken to the adjacent medical tent where they were treated by nurses and doctors, but for some it was already too late. None of the people who died were under the influence of drugs and none were heavily impaired by alcohol. In the area where the main fall happened, several women had been helped out earlier because they were nervous about the pushing and crowd surfers; this might explain why all the people who died were men. Because of the large size of the concert, some concertgoers only realized how serious it had been after they had left the venue. Other bands at Roskilde canceled their performances, whereas D.A.D. (the unofficial "house band" of the festival), which already was scheduled to hold the festival's final concert, decided to change it into a sensitive memorial concert for the people who had not yet left the festival. The incident was examined separately by police, public prosecutors, and subsequent civil trials, all of which determined that it was accidental and that there had been no criminal actions, although the response time from when the people fell over until they were rescued was criticized.

Before this, there had not been major incidents at Roskilde and it was generally considered a very safe festival. Following a detailed review, several new measures were implemented such as a larger safety area with extra emergency exits in front of the stage, more "hard" and "soft" systems to control the number of people allowed into each concert, more spacing and clear separation between audience sections with separate entrances/exits, an expanded video surveillance system making it easier to detect potential problems early, more guards among the audience, an emergency system where the safety staff can shut down the entire concert at the push of a single button, and the chain-of-command was strengthened. Each year, the Roskilde Festival performs a new safety review. A safety network of European festivals and concerts, along with experts, was started (the "YES Group") and many of the measures introduced in Roskilde have later been added elsewhere. As crowd surfing seems to have been among the precipitating factors, it was subsequently forbidden at many festivals in Europe. In part because of the accident at Roskilde, Glastonbury Festival in the United Kingdom was cancelled in 2001 to implement extra safety measures.

Pearl Jam's song "Love Boat Captain" references the tragedy with the line "Lost nine friends we'll never know... two years ago today." When performed in concert, lead singer Eddie Vedder modifies the lyric to reflect the passage of time since the tragedy. Before the opening of the 2001 festival, a memorial to those killed in 2000 containing a stone with the inscription "How fragile we are" (a quote from the Sting song "Fragile") surrounded by nine trees had been made. At the official opening of the 2010 festival (the 10-year anniversary), Patti Smith held the short pre-concert ceremony, and she chose to open the tribute with accompanying music from Mozart. Her lead guitarist, Lenny Kaye, then read out the nine men's names while Smith threw nine roses into the crowd.

2005

The 2005 edition featured artists such as Audioslave, Autechre, Snoop Dogg, Black Sabbath, D-A-D, Duran Duran, Foo Fighters, Green Day, Brian Wilson, Fantômas, Kent, Sonic Youth, Interpol and more than 160 other bands and DJs. This year was also a huge contrast to the previous year on the weather front. Hot and sunny all week.

2006

With more than 79,000 paying visitors (as well as approximately 20,000 volunteer day workers), the 2006 festival was among the biggest in Europe for the year. With only one day of rain and the rest of the week being sunny, this festival also ranks as one with lucky weather conditions. Changes from the previous year included a new swimming lake – which proved to be very successful due to the warm and sunny weather – and a lounge stage called Bar'n. Some of the performing artists were Bob Dylan, Immortal Technique, Roger Waters, Guns N' Roses, Tool, The Strokes, Deftones, Morrissey, Franz Ferdinand, Kanye West, Placebo, Bullet for My Valentine, Arctic Monkeys, Sigur Rós and The Streets. Danish band Magtens Korridorer opened Orange Stage.

2007

Roskilde Festival 2007 turned out to be the wettest one yet, by a rather large margin: Approximately 46 mm of rain fell during the course of the festival, as opposed to 43 mm in 1997, which was the wettest before 2007. The full programme was released on 19 April 2007 and included bands such as Muse, Queens of the Stone Age, Björk, Beastie Boys, My Chemical Romance, Arctic Monkeys, The Who, Red Hot Chili Peppers, The Killers, Tiësto, Nephew and L.O.C. Danish band Volbeat opened Orange Stage.

2008

Roskilde Festival 2008 was dry with the exception of a 10-minute shower on Saturday 5 July and rain that started around 22:00 on Sunday 6 July. The sun shone for the rest of the festival. The full programme was released on 16 April 2008 and included Jay-Z, The Chemical Brothers, Band of Horses, Duffy, Kings of Leon, Neil Young, Radiohead, Grinderman, My Bloody Valentine, Gnarls Barkley, Girl Talk, The Dillinger Escape Plan, The Streets, Judas Priest, Slayer, Tina Dickow, and the Hellacopters.

2009

2010

Main names in 2010 were Gorillaz, Nephew,Them Crooked Vultures, Alice In Chains, Dizzy Mizz Lizzy, The Prodigy, Muse, Kashmir, Prince and Motörhead. The weather at 2010 festival was warm and sunny.

2011

The 2011 had nice weather the first few days, but on Thursday-Friday there was massive rain. The tickets were sold out, with a projected profit of around 10 million Kr. The opening of Orange Stage was done by Danish Veto, and was closed by Kings of Leon. On 2 July, a 35-year-old German woman died after she, in an apparent attempt of teasing the guards, crawled over a safety barrier and accidentally fell  from the Tuborg tower (the tower was subsequently removed entirely).

2013
The 2013 festival featured acts such as Metallica, Sigur Rós, Volbeat, Kvelertak, Goat, Queens of the Stone Age, C2C, Daedelus, Slipknot, Disclosure, Chase and Status, Baauer, Holy Other, Jam City, Vatican Shadow and When Saints Go Machine and Rihanna.

2017

The 2017 festival featured acts such as Foo Fighters, Arcade Fire, The Weeknd, The xx, Ice Cube, Justice, Moderat, Solange, Lorde and Trentemøller.

2018
The 2018 festival featured acts such as Joey Badass, Black Star, David Byrne, Nick Cave and the Bad Seeds, Descendents, Eminem, Fever Ray, First Aid Kit, Fleet Foxes, Four Tet, Ben Frost, Charlotte Gainsbourg, Gorillaz, Interpol, C.V. Jørgensen, Khalid, Dua Lipa, Chelsea Manning, Bruno Mars, Massive Attack, Mogwai, Pablo Moses, My Bloody Valentine, Nephew, Nine Inch Nails, Odesza, Anderson Paak & The Free Nationals, Mike Skinner, St. Vincent, Vince Staples, Stone Sour, Stormzy, The Minds of 99, Alex Vargas and When Saints Go Machine.

2019
The 2019 festival, which had a lineup of over 170 artists, featured acts such as Tears for Fears, The Cure, Bob Dylan, Robert Plant, Travis Scott, Noel Gallagher, Cardi B, Cypress Hill, Neneh Cherry, Rosalía, Testament, Philip H. Anselmo & the Illegals, Ulver, and Behemoth.

2020
The 2020 festival with performers such as Taylor Swift, Deftones, Thom Yorke, and others was supposed to start on 1st of July, but was cancelled due to the COVID-19 pandemic.

See also
 List of historic rock festivals
 List of music festivals
 Crowd control
 Pop culture
 Youth subculture

References

External links

 Official website of the Roskilde Festival
 Official community website of the Roskilde Festival
 Roskilde Festival forum
 Festival radio website
 High quality photos from the Roskilde Festival

 
1971 establishments in Denmark
Clothing-optional events
Concert disasters
Tourist attractions in Region Zealand
Electronic music festivals in Denmark
Music festivals established in 1971
Music festivals in Denmark
Rock festivals in Denmark
Pop music festivals
Summer events in Denmark